Marcus Passage is a stretch of saltwater on the North Coast region of British Columbia, Canada, offshore from the mouth of the Skeena River, south and west of Smith Island. Marcus Passage connects Chatham Sound with Telegraph Passage. The south side of Marcus Passage is defined by an extensive drying bank called Base Sand (locally known as Wilson Bar).

Hydrography

Two shoals obstruct Marcus Passage, the first extends from De Horsey Passage to Base Sand, the second extends from De Horsey Island to Kennedy Island.

See also
Inside Passage
Chatham Sound
Skeena river

References

North Coast of British Columbia
Straits of British Columbia